Long Island University (LIU) is a private university with two main campuses, LIU Post and LIU Brooklyn, in the U.S. state of New York. It offers more than 500 academic programs at its main campuses, online, and at multiple non-residential. LIU has NCAA Division I athletics and hosts the annual George Polk Awards in journalism.

History
LIU was chartered in 1926 in Brooklyn by the New York State Education Department to provide “effective and moderately priced education” to people from “all walks of life.” LIU Brooklyn is located in Downtown Brooklyn, at the corner of Flatbush and DeKalb Avenues. The main building adjoins the 1920s movie house, Paramount Theatre (now called the Schwartz Gymnasium), the building retains much of the original decorative detail and a fully operational Wurlitzer organ that rises from beneath the basketball court floorboards. The campus consists of nine academic buildings; a recreation and athletic complex that includes Division I regulation athletic fields; one on-campus and two nearby residential buildings; and an adjoining parking facility. The campus is home to the university's oldest school, LIU Pharmacy (Arnold & Marie Schwartz College of Pharmacy and Health Sciences), founded in 1891 as the Brooklyn College of Pharmacy, and LIU Global, a four-year bachelor's degree program that allows students to live and study internationally in eight countries across eight semesters. LIU Brooklyn is home to the NCAA Division I Blackbirds, the George Polk Awards for excellence in journalism, and Kumble Theater for the Performing Arts.

In 1951, in response to the growing number of families moving to the suburbs, LIU purchased an  estate known as Hillwood from cereal heiress Marjorie Merriweather Post and her third husband Joseph E. Davies. Located in the town of Brookville on Long Island's Gold Coast, the original home, Warburton Hall, had been built by William A. Prime and was extensively renovated by Marjorie and her second husband Edward F. Hutton. Three years later, the campus was renamed C. W. Post, in honor of Marjorie Post's father. In 2012, the university renamed all campuses. C.W. Post is now LIU Post, the university's largest campus, at 307 acres (125 hectares) of historic 1920s mansions, gardens, athletic fields, art studios and performing arts space, broadcast television and radio stations, an on-campus sustainable energy facility, and the only on-campus equestrian facility on Long Island. LIU Post was home to the NCAA Division II LIU Post Pioneers and is the site of the Tilles Center for the Performing Arts. The school introduced its first online degree plan in 2004

On March 7, 2013, LIU named Kimberly R. Cline as its tenth president, becoming the first woman to lead the private, six-campus institution.

President Kimberly R. Cline outsourced the work of two groups of previously unionized workers on campus, and oversaw the lockout of 400 faculty on the day before the 2016–17 school year. On September 1, 2016, three days after the union's contract expired and five days before the union was due to vote on the new contract, the university cut off the affected staff's email accounts and health insurance, and told them they would be replaced. This is the first time that a college or university in the United States has used a lockout against its faculty members, according to William A. Herbert, executive director of the National Center for the Study of Collective Bargaining in Higher Education and the Professions. Following the lockout, the American Association of University Professors released a statement that it "deplores this action and supports the right of the LIU Brooklyn faculty to collectively bargain in good faith with its administration," and urged the LIU administration to resume negotiations. In the first week of the autumn term, some students at LIU Brooklyn staged a walkout in support of the locked-out teaching staff. With the 236 full-time faculty members and 450 adjuncts locked out, classes were taught by university administrators and temporary staff, and students reported inadequate instruction. The lockout ended on September 14 with an agreement to continue the expired contract until May 31, 2017, and resume negotiations with a mediator.

In response to the COVID-19 pandemic, Long Island University moved all classes to online instruction for the remainder of the Spring 2020 semester. Following a stay-at-home order from then-Governor Andrew Cuomo directing all non-essential businesses to work remotely, administrative and academic offices began operating virtually and LIU fired or furloughed employees whose work was perceived as non-amenable to working remotely, including 84 of 98 unionized employees.

Summer instruction was conducted on-line and LIU plans offered in-person instruction beginning September 8, 2020, with on-line options for people unable to attend lectures.

Following the Thanksgiving recess, all instruction became online, with LIU planning for the start of the Spring 2021 semester to begin on February 1 with in-person instruction.

Organization
LIU is administered by a president and a 27-member board of trustees who elect the president.

Campuses

LIU Brooklyn

LIU Brooklyn includes:

LIU Post

LIU Post includes:

College of Veterinary Medicine
The Vet School's inaugural class began instruction in Fall 2020.  At the time of its founding, there were only 30 vet colleges in the United States.  For over 150 years, the only vet school in the state was the New York State College of Veterinary Medicine at Cornell University in Ithaca, NY.  However, political pressure grew for a second school in the New York City area.  In May 2018, New York State granted $12 million to LIU to develop a vet school.  Pre-clinical instruction is based in Brentwood, NY. Instead of developing its own veterinary hospital, LIU's clinical programs are taught at existing veterinary hospitals and practices.  The LIU Vet School has received a provisional accreditation and will award its first DVM degrees in 2024.

Other LIU locations
LIU Brentwood offers undergraduate and/or graduate programs in education, special education, literacy, mental health counseling, school counseling, psychology, criminal justice, and nursing.

LIU Hudson offers graduate and advanced certificate programs in business, public administration, pharmaceutics, education (early childhood, childhood, literacy, special education, and TESOL), educational leadership, school counseling, school psychology, mental health counseling, and marriage and family therapy.

LIU Riverhead is home to the Homeland Security Management Institute, which offers homeland security training. The institute has been designated a "Homeland Security Center of Excellence" by the United States Congress. Programs are also available in education, special education, literacy, communication studies, new media, cyber security, applied behavior analysis, and TESOL.

Ranking
For 2022, U.S. News & World Report ranked LIU tied for #288 in National Universities.

Athletics

Long Island University
The LIU Sharks compete in NCAA Division I intercollegiate athletics.

Men's Athletics

Women's Athletics

Co-Ed Sports

Spirit Teams

Unification

On October 3, 2018, Long Island University announced that it was unifying the athletic programs of its two campuses into one Division I program, effective with the 2019–20 academic year. The unified LIU program will continue to sponsor all varsity sports that either campus sponsored before the merger. The new program's nickname of Sharks was announced on May 15, 2019. The Sharks retain the Brooklyn campus's affiliation in the Northeast Conference.

The Sharks added two completely new women's sports effective in 2019–20. Shortly before the athletic merger was announced, LIU Brooklyn announced that it would add women's ice hockey; that sport will carry over to the unified program. Shortly after the merger announcement, LIU announced it would add women's water polo, placing that sport in the Metro Atlantic Athletic Conference.

Media
LIU Public Radio on 88.1 FM (WCWP). The LIU television broadcasts on channels 95 and 96 on campus only (PTV) 
LIU Brooklyn's student newspaper is Seawanhaka, and LIU Post's student newspaper is The Pioneer.

Notable alumni
 Alex the Astronaut (1995-), Australian singer-songwriter
Shmuel Avishar (1947-), Israeli basketball player
 Bruce Blakeman, first Presiding Officer of the Nassau County, New York legislature and public official
 Paul Broadie, president of Housatonic Community College and Gateway Community College
 Robert L. Caslen (1953-), Army general, 59th Superintendent of the United States Military Academy, and 29th President of the University of South Carolina
 Mevlüt Çavuşoğlu, diplomat and politician; current Minister of Foreign Affairs of Turkey
 Raymond Dalio, founder of Bridgewater Associates, investor and philanthropist
 Joe Gatto   (1976-), comedian/actor
 Barry Leibowitz (born 1945), American-Israeli basketball player 
 Ivan Leshinsky (born 1947), American-Israeli basketball player
 Vin Lananna (born 1953), Team USA Olympic coach, President of USA Track & Field, former CEO of TrackTown USA, University Athletic Director
 Shawn Liao, basketball player and opera patron 
 Dov Markus (born 1946), Israeli-American soccer player
 Charles F. Masterson, special assistant to President Eisenhower 
 Dina Meyer (born 1968), actress
 Ram Mohan Naidu Kinjarapu, Member of Parliament in Lok Sabha, the lower house of Parliament of India
 Peter Nilsson (born 1974), soccer player
 Brenden Rodney (born 1992), Professional Canadian Track and Field Athlete
 Ossie Schectman (1919–2013), basketball player who scored the first basket in National Basketball Association history
 Tinga Seisay (1928–2015), Sierra Leonean diplomat and pro-democracy activist
 Denise Vasi (1983-), actress

See also
List of Long Island University people

References

External links

Official website

 
Universities and colleges in New York City
Private universities and colleges in New York (state)
Universities and colleges on Long Island
Educational institutions established in 1926
Universities and colleges in Rockland County, New York
Universities and colleges in Brooklyn
Downtown Brooklyn
1926 establishments in New York (state)
1926 establishments in New York City